Severiano "Seve" Boris van Ass (born 10 April 1992) is a Dutch field hockey player who plays as a midfielder or forward for HGC and the Dutch national team.

He is the son of Dutch field hockey coach Paul van Ass. He participated at the 2016 Summer Olympics. In June 2019, he was selected in the Netherlands squad for the 2019 EuroHockey Championship and was named the captain for the tournament. They won the bronze medal by defeating Germany 4–0.

Club career
Van Ass started playing hockey at Victoria, a field hockey club in Rotterdam. In 2008 he switched to HGC, with whom he won the 2010–11 Euro Hockey League. In 2013 he returned to Rotterdam to play for HC Rotterdam, where he played for five seasons until 2018 when he returned to HGC.

References

External links

1992 births
Living people
Dutch male field hockey players
Male field hockey midfielders
Male field hockey forwards
2014 Men's Hockey World Cup players
Field hockey players at the 2016 Summer Olympics
2018 Men's Hockey World Cup players
Field hockey players at the 2020 Summer Olympics
Olympic field hockey players of the Netherlands
Sportspeople from Rotterdam
HGC players
HC Rotterdam players
Men's Hoofdklasse Hockey players
2023 Men's FIH Hockey World Cup players
21st-century Dutch people